Klaeng is a district (amphoe) on the coast of Rayong province, eastern Thailand.

History
Klaeng's history dates back to  the Ayutthaya Kingdom. Due to its location mid-way between Mueang Rayong district and Chanthaburi province and due to its abundance of natural resources such as fertile rice fields and many watercourses, it has been a magnet for immigration.

Its name "Klaeng" is believed to be a variant of the Chong word Ka-laeng (กะแล่ง), which means "walking catfish".

Since the Ayutthaya period, Klaeng has been a place to gather people for war service.

In the reign of King Rama V, Mueang Klaeng was a fourth class city under Monthon Chanthaburi. The former city offices were in Ban Laem Mueang, Tambon Paknam Prasae. In 1897 the office was moved to Ban Pho Thong, on the north side of Wat Pho Thong. In 1908 Mueang Klaeng was downgraded to a district of Rayong Province.

Geography
Neighboring districts are (from the west clockwise): Mueang Rayong, Wang Chan, and Khao Chamao of Rayong Province; Kaeng Hang Maeo and Na Yai Am of Chanthaburi province. To the south is the Gulf of Thailand.

Klaeng's main watercourse is the Prasae River.

Administration
The district is divided into 15 sub-districts (tambons), which are further subdivided into 146 villages (mubans). Klaeng is a town (thesaban mueang) which covers parts of tambons Thang Kwian and Wang Wa. There are a further four sub-district municipalities (thesaban tambons): Kong Din covers parts of tambon Kong Din, Thung Khwai Kin parts of tambons Thung Khwai Kin and Khlong Pun, Pak Nam Prasae, parts of tambons Pak Nam Krasae and Sunthorn Phu, and the entiretambons of Kram and Chak Phong. There are also 15 tambon administrative organizations (TAO).

Missing numbers are tambons which now form Khao Chamao district.

References

External links
amphoe.com(Thai)

Klaeng